The Republic of the Congo competed at the 1992 Summer Olympics in Barcelona, Spain.

Competitors
The following is the list of number of competitors in the Games.

Results by event

Athletics
Men's 100m metres
David N'Koua 
 Heat — 10.96 (→ did not advance)

Men's 800m metres
Symphorien Samba 
 Heat — 1:51.75 (→ did not advance)

Women's 400m Hurdles
Addo Ndala
 Heat — DNS (→ did not advance)

Swimming
Men's 50m Freestyle
 Gilles Coudray
 Heat – 28.11 (→ did not advance, 69th place)

References

Sources
Official Olympic Reports

External links
 

Nations at the 1992 Summer Olympics
1992
1992 in the Republic of the Congo